"The Lady's Dressing Room" is a poem written by Jonathan Swift first published in 1732. In the poem, Strephon sneaks into his sweetheart Celia's dressing room while she is away only to become disillusioned at how filthy and smelly it is. Swift uses this poem to satirize both women's vain attempts to match an ideal image and men's expectation that the illusion be real. For the poem's grotesque treatment of bodily functions, Swift was slandered by literary critics and psychoanalyzed as suffering from "the excremental vision".

Summary
The poem was written by Jonathan Swift, who was most famous for his book Gulliver's Travels. This author was a satirist to the core. He mocked, vexed, and made comical political commentary. Thomas Sheridan called him "a man whose original genius and uncommon talents have raised him, in the general estimation, above all other writers of the age".

This poem chronicles the misadventure of Strephon as he explores the vacant dressing room of the woman he loves. Beginning with an ideal image of his sweetheart, he looks through the contents of her room, but encounters only objects that repulse him. He finds sweaty smocks, dirt-filled combs, greasy  facecloths, grimy towels, snot-encrusted handkerchiefs, jars of spit, cosmetics derived from dog  urine, pimple medication,  stockings smelling of dirty toes and a mucky, rancid clothes chest. Beholding such squalor, culminating in the discovery of her chamber pot, he is slapped with the reality that Celia (the name "Celia" means "heavenly") is not a "goddess", but as disgustingly human as he is, as shown in line 118: "Oh! Celia, Celia, Celia shits!"

Ever after his discovery of Celia's nauseating dressing room he can never look at women the same way again. In every woman he sees through the powdered wigs and painted faces to the grime beneath.

Swift ends the poem by suggesting that if young men only ignore the stench and accept the painted illusion, they can enjoy the "charms of womanhood".

He couldn't handle the realization that women aren't perfect and angelic as they appear to be. He realized that women do indeed defecate, they perspire, they get sick, and they are human beings with human bodies that perform the normal bodily functions. Another interpretation of the poem is that he was perhaps on the side of women, and men for that matter, in calling everyone to be more merciful and accept people the way they are. Both Strephon and Celia are metaphors for men and women, representing everything good and bad. He comments on the "game" that courting, mating, and existing together has become.

Analysis
This poem is full of satire, starting in the first line: 
"Five hours (and who can do it less in?) / By haughty Celia spent in dressing;"

He starts out from the beginning commenting on the length of time it takes women to prepare themselves. He goes on into greater detail about the repulsive things he sees and finds:

"As from within Pandora's box, / When Epimetheus oped the locks, / A sudden universal crew / Of humane evils upward flew, / He still was comforted to find / That hope at last remained behind. // So Strephon, lifting up the lid / To view what in the chest was hid, / The vapours flew from out the vent. / But Strephon cautious never meant / The bottom of the pan to grope, / And foul his hands in search of hope." // This is a satirical comment on a woman's box of belongings and beauty supplies. It symbolized evil and human flaws. We picture Strephon going through the box, as we watch laughing at him for not being able to find anything good inside.

This poem is sometimes seen as an attack on women. In response to this poem, Lady Mary Wortley Montagu wrote "The Reasons that Induced Dr. S. to Write a Poem call'd the Lady's Dressing Room". She argues that Swift wrote "The Lady's Dressing Room" after experiencing sexual disappointment with a prostitute. This poem has also been seen as a critique of the lengths to which women go in order to meet the ideal image of the female body and men's expectation that the illusion be real. In addition, Swift bitterly satirizes and derides in disgusting detail the human body and its functions, which he viewed as repulsive.

Swift employs Juvenalian satire in this poem. Swift's time was a period in which pretense and superficiality were the norm. He was often referred to as misanthropic, and this work, "The Lady's Dressing Room", led him to be "accused of misogyny". Swift's offensive, and improper content, as well as the harsh manner in which he presented it, led him to have a less than favorable reputation amongst his compatriots, especially women.

Poem in culture

The poem was received like any satire: some loved it and some hated it. For example, the poem provoked a negative response from Lady Mary Wortley Montagu, featured in her poem “The Reasons that Induced Dr. S. to Write a Poem called The Lady’s Dressing Room.” In this poem, she voices what many thought was the reason for his writing the poem: sexual frustration. Her poem is about his searching out a prostitute and not being able to perform sexually. He blames it on her, she on him, and she refuses to give the money he requests back. In Montagu's opinion, and subsequently her poetic response, Swift decides to get back at the prostitute by writing the poem.

Another reference to the poem can be found in George Elliot's Middlemarch, where the character Celia Brooke is believed to be an allusion to The Lady's Dressing Room's Celia. Elliot's Celia is the sister of the main character, Dorothea, and she is a somewhat superficial person who likes to talk about physical things. She aspires to be a wife and mother and has no interest in thinking about the deeper aspects of life.

Notes

References
Clark, John R. (1991) The modern satiric grotesque and its traditions

External links 
Text of “The Lady’s Dressing Room” on Wikisource
Text of “The Reasons that Induced Dr. S. to Write a Poem call'd the Lady's Dressing Room”

1732 poems
Irish satirical poems
Works by Jonathan Swift